Exosome component 7, also known as EXOSC7, is a human gene, the protein product of which is part of the exosome complex.

Interactions 

Exosome component 7 has been shown to interact with:
 Exosome component 1,
 Exosome component 2,  and
 Exosome component 6.

References

Further reading